Horacio Zeballos was the defending champion but chose not to defend his title.

Dušan Lajović won the title after defeating Leonardo Mayer 6–2, 7–6(7–4) in the final.

Seeds

Draw

Finals

Top half

Bottom half

References
Main Draw
Qualifying Draw

Båstad Challenger - Singles
2017 Singles
Bast